The Upper Bedoulian Formation is a geological formation in the Murcia Region, Spain whose strata date back to the Early Cretaceous (late Barremian to early Aptian stage). The marls were deposited in an open marine environment. The lower unit ( thick) is marly with iron concretions and septaria.

The formation was deposited in the Pre-Betic Basin in southeastern Spain. During deposition, Iberia was an island, separated by seas from North Africa and France.

The Upper Bedoulian Formation has provided very few fossils; the ammonite Dufrenoyia dufrenoyi and the coral Montlivaltia multiformis.

Correlation

See also 
 La Huérguina Formation, Barremian-Aptian Lagerstätte of the South Iberian Basin
 Arcillas de Morella Formation, Barremian-Aptian formation of the Morella Basin
 Xert Formation, Barremian-Aptian formation of the Maestrazgo Basin

References

Bibliography 

 

Geologic formations of Spain
Lower Cretaceous Series of Europe
Cretaceous Spain
Aptian Stage
Barremian Stage
Marl formations
Open marine deposits
Paleontology in Spain
Formations